is a song recorded by Japanese duo Yoasobi. It was released as a standalone single on November 18, 2022, through Sony Music Entertainment Japan, as the third song from the novel collection project Hajimete no after "Mr.", and "Suki da". The song was based on the novel Yūrei, written by 147th Naoki Prize-winning Mizuki Tsujimura.

Background and release

On December 1, 2021, the same date as their EP The Book 2 release, Yoasobi announced the project Hajimete no, a collaboration between the duo and four Naoki Prize-winning novelists: Rio Shimamoto, Mizuki Tsujimura, Miyuki Miyabe, and Eto Mori, to produce songs based on the authors' novel under the theme of "a story to read when you do [something] for the first time". All novels were published as a book on February 16, 2022, titled Hajimete no. It is about a middle school "I" who runs away from home and arrives at a seaside town. She meets a mysterious girl who holds bouquets of flowers at the beach at night.

On November 6, 2022, Yoasobi posted a series of stories via their pop-up store Tabi Suru Honya-san Yoasobi Gō's Instagram account, revealing a snippet of the new song based on Yūrei, titled "Umi no Manimani". Followed by numerous texts from the based novel, the last story announced that the song would be released on November 18. To commemorate the release, billboards of the 400-character handwritten reading impressions of  Yūrei, were placed inside the Tokyo Metro subways and at Shibuya Station from November 7 to 13. Japanese voice actor Shin'ichirō Kamio, actress Tao Tsuchiya, YouTuber Bunkei, singer Momoko Gumi Company (Bish), comedian Nishida (Lalande), and sociologist Noritoshi Furuichi are in charge of writing the impressions. All billboards were later featured in the single's teaser video, uploaded on November 15.

Composition

"Umi no Manimani" is a medium-tempo track written by member Ayase, expressing "the mood change of the protagonist who runs away from home to the mysterious world of the beach at night, which is the main worldview of the story." The song was composed in the key of B minor, 98 beats per minute with a running time of four minutes and 15 seconds.

Music video

An accompanying music video for "Umi no Manimani" is scheduled for a premiere on March 21, 2023. It was directed by Asuka Dokai.

Charts

Release history

References

External links
 
 

2022 singles
2022 songs
Japanese-language songs
Songs about ghosts
Sony Music Entertainment Japan singles
Yoasobi songs